The 8th IBU Junior Open European Championships were held from 15 to 19 February 2023 in Madona, Latvia.

Schedule
All times are local (UTC+2).

Medal summary

Medal table

Men

Women

Mixed

References

External links
Official website

IBU Junior Open European Championships
Junior Open European Championships
IBU Junior Open European Championships
IBU Junior Open European Championships
International sports competitions hosted by Latvia
IBU Junior Open European Championships